{{DISPLAYTITLE:Pi2 Pegasi}}

π2 Pegasi, Latinized as Pi2 Pegasi, is a single star in the northern constellation Pegasus. It is yellow-white in hue and visible to the naked eye as a faint point of light with an apparent visual magnitude of +4.28. The distance to this object is approximately 263 light years based on parallax, and it is drifting further away with a radial velocity of +5 km/s. This star is an outlying member of the Ursa Major Moving Group.

This object has a stellar classification of F5 III, matching an aging giant star that has exhausted the supply of hydrogen at its core then cooled and expanded off the main sequence. At present it has 8.5 times the radius of the Sun. The star is 530 million years old with 2.48 times the Sun's mass. It shows a high rotation rate considering its evolutionary status, with a projected rotational velocity of 140 km/s. The star has been noted as a possible variable shell star. Pi2 Pegasi is radiating 103 times the Sun's luminosity from its swollen photosphere at an effective temperature of 6,300 K.

References

External links
 

F-type giants
Pegasus (constellation)
Pegasi, Pi2
Durchmusterung objects
Pegasi, 29
210459
109410
8454
Ursa Major Moving Group